John Atkin is a former two term Democratic member of the Connecticut Senate from Norwalk, Connecticut's 25th Senate district and a former three term member of the Connecticut House of Representatives from Norwalk, Connecticut's 140th House district.

Early life and family  
Son of William Wilson Atkin, a book publisher.

Political career 

In 1982, Atkin was challenged for his seat in the Connecticut House by Janet Mills, but was re-elected.

Atkin was defeated for re-election to the Connecticut House by Janet Mills in 1984.

In March 1986, State Senator Andrew Santaniello died unexpectedly, creating a vacancy. Atkin defeated Joseph Santo for the seat.

In 1988, he faced a challenge from Republican Michael Lyons, Norwalk Common Council member for the senate seat, but Atkin was re-elected.

Atkin was defeated for re-election to the Connecticut Senate by Robert Genuario in 1990.

References 

Democratic Party Connecticut state senators
Democratic Party members of the Connecticut House of Representatives
Politicians from Norwalk, Connecticut